Shin Yeon-shick (born 1976) is a South Korean film director and screenwriter. He directed The Fair Love (2010), The Russian Novel (2013), and Rough Play (2013).

Career
Born in Seoul in 1976, Shin Yeon-shick dropped out of his Spanish Studies major at university to pursue a career in filmmaking. In 2005, Shin wrote and directed the black-and-white indie A Great Actor, which had its international premiere at the International Film Festival Rotterdam.

His next film was The Fair Love (2010), a nuanced, lyrical inter-generational romance starring Ahn Sung-ki and Lee Ha-na. But despite its well-known actors and positive reviews, the film was a box office failure with mainstream audiences.

Shin continued making low-budget experimental films. The Russian Novel, an ambitious arthouse drama about a depressed author (played by Kang Shin-hyo) who wakes up from a 27-year coma to find himself a literary sensation for a novel he didn't write, drew even more critical acclaim. The Director's Guild of Korea named Shin as Best Director at the 17th Busan International Film Festival in 2012, and he also won Best Screenplay from the Korean Association of Film Critics Awards and the Buil Film Awards.

In 2013, he directed Rough Play (titled "An Actor Is an Actor" in Korean) from a screenplay by Kim Ki-duk about the dark underbelly of the Korean film industry through a young actor's quick rise and fall, and cast K-pop star Lee Joon in the leading role. Shin was determined to reshape Kim's symbolism-heavy script into a more narrative-driven, commercial film, and during post-production he rewrote and reshot 50% of the film.

This was followed by The Avian Kind, in which a man goes on a road trip to search for his missing wife, and finally finds her 15 years later, only she's transformed into a bird. It made its world premiere at the Jeonju International Film Festival as part of the 2014 Jeonju Digital Project, and received a theatrical release in 2015. Shin then shared screenwriting credit with Kim Sung-ho for How to Steal a Dog (2014).

His upcoming project Like a French Film is an omnibus composed of four short films titled A Time to Leave, A Lady Selling Beer, A Remaining Time and Like a French Film, starring Shin Min-cheol and Kim Dasom.

Filmography 
Piano Lesson (2003) - director
A Great Actor (2005) - director, screenwriter, producer, editor
The Villains (short film, 2007) - actor
The Fair Love (2010) - director, screenwriter, executive producer, investor 
The Russian Novel (2013) - director, screenwriter, executive producer
Rough Play (2013) - director, script editor, actor, executive producer
How to Steal a Dog (2014) - screenwriter
The Avian Kind (2015) - director, screenwriter, actor
Like a French Film (2015) - director, screenwriter
Dongju: The Portrait of a Poet (2016) - screenwriter, executive producer
If You Were Me (2016) - director, screenwriter
 Cassiopeia (2022) - director
 One Win (2023) - director, screenwriter

Awards 
2013 14th Jeonju International Film Festival: Moët Rising Star Award (The Russian Novel)
2013 17th Busan International Film Festival: DGK Award for Best Director (The Russian Novel)
2013 33rd Korean Association of Film Critics Awards: Best Screenplay (The Russian Novel)
2014 23rd Buil Film Awards: Best Screenplay (The Russian Novel)
2016 3rd Wildflower Film Awards: Best Screenplay (The Avian Kind)
2016 16th Director's Cut Awards: Best Production of the Year (Dongju: The Portrait of a Poet)
2016 25th Buil Film Awards: Best Screenplay (Dongju: The Portrait of a Poet)
2016 37th Blue Dragon Film Awards: Best Screenplay (Dongju: The Portrait of a Poet)
2022  42nd Korean Association of Film Critics Awards : International Critics League Korea Headquarters Award  (Cassiopeia)

References

External links 
 
 
 

1976 births
Living people
South Korean film directors
South Korean screenwriters
South Korean male film actors